Absaroka may refer to:

Places
 Absaroka (proposed state), parts of the states of Montana, South Dakota, and Wyoming, that contemplated secession and statehood in 1939
 Absaroka Range, a sub-range of the Rocky Mountains stretching across Montana and Wyoming in the northwestern United States

Other uses
 Absaroke or Absaroka, a Native American people also known as the Crow
 Absaroka County, the fictional location of the Walt Longmire Mysteries series of novels by Craig Johnson (author) and its TV adaptation, Longmire
 Absaroka sequence, a cratonic sequence that extended from the end of the Mississippian through the Permian periods 
 USS Absaroka (ID-2518), a steamer in the United States Navy

See also
 Absaroka-Beartooth Wilderness 
 North Absaroka Wilderness